The Kamehameha Schools Hawaii Campus consists of an elementary, middle and high school operated by Kamehameha Schools on the island of Hawaii.

History 

The first campus was built in the Kapālama area of Honolulu, then a Maui Campus, and finally, the Hawaii Island Campus. Plans were announced in 1999 to move from a smaller temporary campus.

As of 2006, the  campus served approximately 1,120 students from grades K-12. Students attend from the entire island, although those on the western side between Paauilo and Naālehu have the option of apply to the main Kapālama Campus as boarders.

The Keaau campus is located on land formerly owned by William Herbert Shipman, who, along with Captain Elders and Samuel M. Damon, acquired the property in 1881 when it was auctioned by the estate of King Lunalilo, a grandnephew of King Kamehameha I.

In addition to classroom buildings at the elementary and middle school division, shared buildings include a learning center, administration building, and a cafeteria/band facility. 
Construction of the Hawaii Campus cost roughly $225 million.
Like its sister campus in Pukalani on Maui, the Hawaii Campus graduated its first class in 2006. Ninia M. E. Aldrich became principal of the high school in 2002. About 100 students were in the first high school class in 2002.

Traditions 

The Kamehameha Schools Hawaii started traditions aside from those adopted from the older Kapalama Campus. Among these are:

Hoike: Annual student-produced performance of dancing, singing, and drama.

Elementary concerts: Concerts held in the Haaeamahi Dining Hall.

Junior Class Greek Day: a Greek Culture Day with games, food, music, and dance. Students are split into competing "city-states" with cheers and Greek costumes .

Freshmen Makahiki: students play Hawaiian games and learn to dance hula.

May Day: Every year on May 1, students participate in the festivities of hula. All elementary students participate in their show, and Hawaiian Ensemble puts on the show for the middle school. Normally, the middle school and the elementary school watch and support each other's shows.

Ho'olaule'a: Every year the school puts on a Hoolaulea which consists of games, foods, booths by local vendors, entertainment from the elementary choir, and a local band.

Curriculum 
In addition to providing a comprehensive curriculum, the school draws upon the unique resources of the island, including the University of Hawai'i, Hilo and Hawai'i Community College, as well as astronomical observatories on Mauna Kea.
The forestry, geologic, marine life, and agricultural aspects of the island also play an important role in the curriculum.

Kamehameha Schools offers many extra-curricular activities and sports.
The marching band appeared in the 2008 Tournament of Roses Parade.

The school offers classes in Hawaiian language in middle and high school as well as Japanese and Spanish in high school.

Notable people
Alumni
Kolten Wong, Major League Baseball player
Faculty
Bob Wagner, former athletic director

See also
 Kamehameha Schools Maui Campus
 Kamehameha Schools Song Contest

References

External links
 Hawaii Campus on Kamehameha Schools official web site

Kamehameha Schools
Private K-12 schools in Hawaii County, Hawaii
Buildings and structures in Hilo, Hawaii
Educational institutions established in 1996
1996 establishments in Hawaii